is a former Japanese football player.

Playing career
Kohei Takano played for AC Nagano Parceiro from 2008 to 2014.

References

External links

1985 births
Living people
Tokyo Gakugei University alumni
Association football people from Chiba Prefecture
Japanese footballers
J3 League players
Japan Football League players
AC Nagano Parceiro players
Association football defenders